Fernand Gobet (born February 12, 1962 in Switzerland) is a cognitive scientist and a cognitive psychologist, currently Professor of Cognitive Psychology at the London School of Economics. His research interests focus on the study of cognition, especially in the areas of cognitive architectures, perception, intuition, problem solving, learning and decision making. He has developed the CHREST cognitive architecture, an acronym for Chunk Hierarchy and REtrieval STructures, which is a complete architecture for the processes of learning and perception used by humans.
He is a chess International Master, and played numerous times for the Swiss national team. He was co-editor of the Swiss Chess Review from 1981 to 1989. His Elo rating is 2400.

Books
 Addis, M., Lane, P., Sozou, P., & Gobet, F. (Eds.) (2019). Scientific discovery in the social sciences. New York: Springer.
 Gobet, F. (2018). The psychology of chess. London: Routledge.
 Gobet, F. (2015). Understanding expertise: A multidisciplinary approach. London: Palgrave.
 Gobet, F. & Schiller, M. (Eds.) (2014). Problem gambling: Cognition, prevention and treatment. London: Palgrave Macmillan.
 Gobet, F. (2011). Psychologie du talent et de l’expertise. Paris: De Boeck.
 Gobet, F., Chassy, P., & Bilalić, M. (2011). Foundations of cognitive psychology. New York, NY: McGraw Hill.
 Gobet, F., de Voogt, A., & Retschitzki, J. (2004). Moves in mind - The psychology of board games. Hove, UK: Psychology Press.
 de Groot, A. & Gobet, F. (1996). Perception and memory in chess. Heuristics of the professional eye. Assen: Van Gorcum.
 Gobet, F. (1993). Les mémoires d'un joueur d'échecs. Fribourg (Switzerland): Editions Universitaires

References

External links
 Page on Chess Programming Wiki
 
 

1962 births
Living people
Cognitive scientists
Artificial intelligence researchers
Swiss psychologists
Swiss chess players
Chess International Masters
Chess Olympiad competitors
Academics of Brunel University London

Academics of the University of Liverpool